Plicofollis magatensis is a species of catfish in the family Ariidae. It was described by Albert William Herre in 1926, originally under the genus Arius. It inhabits freshwaters in the Philippines.

References

Ariidae
Taxa named by Albert William Herre
Fish described in 1926